Nathan Gafuik (born June 12, 1985) is a Canadian gymnast, who has competed at two Summer Olympics (2008 and 2012) and has won medals at Commonwealth level.

Early life
He took up gymnastics at the age of four and has achieved gymnastic success despite a diagnosis of Addison's disease at the age of 15. He won the Canadian junior all-round title at the 2003 Canadian National Championships, leading him to be named as Canada's alternate at the 2004 Olympic Games, although he was unused.

Gymnastics career

Early gymnastics career
At the 2006 Commonwealth Games in Melbourne, he won three medals, a gold and two silvers.  The gold came in the men's team event, with the silvers coming in the men's all-round and the men's vault.  That year he was also part of the Canadian men's team that came 6th at the World Gymnastics Championship in Aarhus, the best result ever for a Canadian team. He won senior Canadian national titles in the vault (2005, 2006 and 2008), the parallel bars (2006) and the floor (2008).  In 2007, he underwent wrist surgery in spring 2007, the time off contributing to his fifth place in the men's all-round in the Canadian Championships before the 2008 Olympics.

2008 Summer Olympics
The youngest member of the Canadian men's gymnastics team, Gafuik competed at the 2008 Summer Olympics, finishing in 17th place in the men's all-round, the second best performance ever by a Canadian gymnast.

He then won the 2010 Canadian Championships.  In 2011, while studying at Athabasca University, he won a medal at the Universidae, bronze in the men's all-round.  It was the first medal Canada won at that championships.

2012 Summer Olympics
Canada's only male gymnast to qualify for the 2012 Summer Olympics, Gafuik's preparation for the Games was hampered by a thumb injury, severe enough to require surgery.  He did not compete in all of the events, sitting out the other apparatus qualifiers to concentrate on the high bar, his favoured event.  Unfortunately, his score of 13.866, due to a fall from the bar, was not enough to qualify him for the final.

2014 Commonwealth Games
He was part of the Canadian team that took bronze in the men's team event at the 2014 Commonwealth Games, along with Zachary Clay, Anderson Loran, Kevin Lytwyn and Scott Morgan.

References

External links 
 Team Canada Biography

Gymnasts at the 2012 Summer Olympics
Gymnasts at the 2008 Summer Olympics
Olympic gymnasts of Canada
1985 births
Sportspeople from Calgary
Living people
Commonwealth Games gold medallists for Canada
Commonwealth Games silver medallists for Canada
Commonwealth Games bronze medallists for Canada
Gymnasts at the 2006 Commonwealth Games
Gymnasts at the 2014 Commonwealth Games
Canadian male artistic gymnasts
Commonwealth Games medallists in gymnastics
Universiade medalists in gymnastics
Universiade silver medalists for Canada
Universiade bronze medalists for Canada
Medalists at the 2011 Summer Universiade
20th-century Canadian people
21st-century Canadian people
Medallists at the 2006 Commonwealth Games
Medallists at the 2014 Commonwealth Games